HMVS Countess of Hopetoun was a 1st Class Torpedo Boat of the Victorian Naval Forces, Commonwealth Naval Forces and the Royal Australian Navy.  She was named after Hersey, Countess of Hopetoun and later Marchioness of Linlithgow, the wife of the 7th Earl of Hopetoun, the then Governor of Victoria and later the first Governor-General of Australia.

Operational history
Built by Yarrow and Co. on the River Thames, Countess of Hopetoun was the last vessel constructed for the Victorian Naval Forces. She arrived at Williamstown, Victoria via the Cape of Good Hope after 154 days under way.

The vessel joined the Commonwealth Naval Forces following federation in 1901, then the Royal Australian Navy when it was formed in 1911. During World War I she served in Victorian waters and as a tender to HMAS Cerberus. She attended the arrival of His Royal Highness Edward, The Prince of Wales in Port Phillip on 28 May 1920. The prince arrived aboard the battlecruiser  and was received by no less than 31 warships.

Fate
Countess of Hopetoun was sold to Edward Hill of North Melbourne in April 1924 and scrapped the following year. Her hull was later sunk near Swan Island in Port Phillip.

See also
List of Victorian Naval Forces ships
Colonial navies of Australia – Victoria
List of Royal Australian Navy ships

References

Bibliography 
Warships of Australia, Ross Gillett, Illustrations Colin Graham, Rigby Limited, 1977, 
All the World's Fighting Ships 1860-1905, edited by Robert Gardiner, Roger Chesneau and Eugene M. Kolesnik, Conway Maritime Press, 1979. 

Torpedo boats of the Victorian Naval Forces
Torpedo boats of the Royal Australian Navy
1891 ships